Xinbarag Youqi (New Barag Right Banner) Baogede Airport  is a general aviation airport serving New Barag Right Banner (Xinbarag Youqi) in Hulunbuir, Inner Mongolia, China. It is located northeast of the Baogede Wula Mountains, after which it is named.

Construction for the airport began in 2013, and it was opened on 26 December 2017.

References 

Airports in Inner Mongolia
Airports established in 2017
2017 establishments in China
Hulunbuir